Plagiostomoceras is an orthocerid cephalopod from the lower Paleozoic (Upper Ordovician to Lower Devonian) of Europe and Australia.

Shells of Plagiostomoceras are long slender orthocones with circular to slightly depressed cross sections. Sutures are straight or slightly oblique and may have faint lateral lobes. The siphuncle is central or offset, probably ventrally. The aperture is strongly oblique, sloping adapically toward the presumed venter.

Plagiostomoceras is included in the  Michelinoceratinae, a subfamily of the Orthoceratidae.

See also
List of nautiloids

References
 Sweet, W.C. 1964.  Nautiloidea-Orthocerida. Treatise on Invertebrate Paleontology, Part K. Geological Society of America and University of Kansas press. Teichert & Moore,(eds)

Nautiloids
Late Ordovician first appearances
Early Devonian genus extinctions